Events from the year 1977 in Scotland.

Incumbents 

 Secretary of State for Scotland and Keeper of the Great Seal – Bruce Millan

Law officers 
 Lord Advocate – Ronald King Murray
 Solicitor General for Scotland – Lord McCluskey

Judiciary 
 Lord President of the Court of Session and Lord Justice General – Lord Emslie
 Lord Justice Clerk – Lord Wheatley
 Chairman of the Scottish Land Court – Lord Birsay

Events 
 3 May – 1977 Scottish District Council elections held, with Labour making significant losses.
 17 May – Queen Elizabeth II commences her Jubilee tour in Glasgow.
 18 May – Queen Elizabeth II visits Cumbernauld and Stirling.
 19 May – Queen Elizabeth II visits Perth and Dundee.
 23–27 May – Queen Elizabeth II visits Edinburgh.
 27 May – Queen Elizabeth II opens the new Air Terminal Building at Edinburgh Airport.
 4 June – Scotland's 2–1 victory over England at Wembley is followed by a pitch invasion during which sections of pitch and crossbars are removed by fans.
 10 August – Kenny Dalglish, 26-year-old Scotland striker, becomes Britain's most expensive footballer in a £440,000 transfer from Celtic F.C. to Liverpool.
 September
 Last manufacture of coal gas on the UK mainland at Muirkirk.
 First part of St Fergus Gas Terminal in Aberdeenshire opens.
 12 October – Scotland beat Wales 2–0 at Anfield to qualify for the 1978 World Cup finals.
 15–16 October – "World's End Murders" of two 17-year-old girls in Edinburgh. Christine Eadie and Helen Scott, both 17, disappear after leaving the World's End pub in Edinburgh, Scotland. Their bodies are found tied and strangled in the countryside the next day. In 2014, serial killer Angus Sinclair is convicted of the crime.
 14 November – Tam Dalyell, Labour MP for West Lothian (UK Parliament constituency), asks what becomes known as the West Lothian question.
 Late? – Buchanan Street bus station opens in Glasgow.

Births 
 19 March – Scott Wilson, footballer
 30 March – Hugo Rifkind, journalist
 18 April – Jonathan Rowson, chess grandmaster
 12 May – Graeme Dott, snooker player
 30 July – Derek Mackay, Member of Scottish Parliament and Government minister
 September – Jenni Fagan, novelist and poet
 22 November – Neil McCallum, cricketer
 28 November – Gavin Rae, international footballer
 30 November – Rae Hendrie, television actress

Deaths 
 6 October – Molly Urquhart, actress (born 1906)
 30 November – Thomas Corbett, 2nd Baron Rowallan, soldier, governor and chief scout (born 1895)
 27 December – James Marshall, international footballer (born 1908)

The arts
 19 August – Art punk band Skids, founded by Stuart Adamson, plays its first gig, in Dunfermline.
 First St Magnus Festival of the arts held on Orkney, organised by local residents including English composer Peter Maxwell Davies and Orcadian poet George Mackay Brown.

See also 
 1977 in Northern Ireland

References 

 
Years of the 20th century in Scotland
1970s in Scotland